Robert William Porter (August 13, 1926 – November 6, 1991) was a United States district judge of the United States District Court for the Northern District of Texas.

Education and career

Born in Monmouth, Illinois, Porter was in the United States Navy during World War II, from 1944 to 1946. He received an Artium Baccalaureus degree from Monmouth College in 1949 and a Juris Doctor from the University of Michigan Law School in 1952. He was home office counsel of the Reserve Life Insurance Company in Dallas, Texas from 1952 to 1954. He then went into private practice as an attorney in Dallas from 1954 to 1974. During that time, Porter was a Councilman of Richardson, Texas from 1961 to 1966 and then was Mayor from 1966 to 1967. He was also Mayor pro tem in 1966. He was special counsel of the County of Dallas, Texas from 1972 to 1974.

Federal judicial service

Porter was nominated by President Richard Nixon on April 22, 1974, to a seat on the United States District Court for the Northern District of Texas vacated by Judge Leo Brewster. He was confirmed by the United States Senate on June 13, 1974, and received his commission on June 20, 1974. He served as Chief Judge from 1986 to 1989. He assumed senior status due to a certified disability on January 17, 1990. His service terminated on November 6, 1991, due to his death in Dallas.

References

Sources
 

1926 births
1991 deaths
Judges of the United States District Court for the Northern District of Texas
United States district court judges appointed by Richard Nixon
20th-century American judges
United States Navy sailors
University of Michigan Law School alumni
Monmouth College alumni